Self-defense Kushch Units (SKU) — Ukrainian self-defense units formed to protect Ukrainian villages, as well as to create a rear for the UPA. They operated in 1942–1946 and were inspected by the district leaders of the separate formation of OUN – OUN(b).

Name 
"Kushch" was an administrative unit of Ukrainian Insurgent Army consisting of 5-7 villages.

Goals 
Most of their activity was aimed at:
 military training of the population;
 protection of Ukrainian villages and population from Polish and Soviet partisans, as well as gangs of robbers;
 construction of underground bunkers, hospitals and warehouses;
 protection of insurgent warehouses and hospitals;
 accumulation of food, medicine and clothing supplies for UPA units;
 providing transport;
 maintaining communication through liaisons;
 occasional participation in sabotage operations aimed at supporting the attacks of UPA units.

Structure 
Self-defense Kushch Units were organized into stanytsas, uniting 1-2 villages, as well as kushchi ("bushes", 5-7 villages). The combat detachments of SKU were based on kushchi, numbering from 30 to 50 soldiers, i. e. 3-4 roji ("swarms"). The command of Kushch units included:

 military officer (kushchovyi) – the head of the kushch
 financial clerk
 propaganda officer
 Sluzhba Bezpeky representative
 representative of the Ukrainian Red Cross organization
 liaison officer

In the structure of the OUN, the term kushch was introduced to replace the terms volost and subdistrict, kushch was subjected to district (and above that – supra-district or povit) organizational and mobilization officers. But SKU members were not obliged to also be members of the OUN.

SKU activities

In Ukraine 
SKU first appeared in early 1942 in Volhynia and Polissya. In some areas, the so-called "Special Purpose Units" (SPUs) were established, while in others, "Self-Defense Kuschsh Units" (SKUs) were organized. In Volhynia, the organization of this movement was in the hands of Dmytro Klyachkivsky, who on August 30, 1943, ordered the complete mobilization of the Ukrainian population in Volhynia in individual villages. SKU members joined the UPA, but over time, when the units were to be disbanded, partisans were sent to rural self-defense formations. The members of the SKU were distinguished from the UPA units by the fact that they legally lived in the villages located on the territory of the kushch and were united only to carry out a certain action. SKU were managed through the OUN military kushch officers ("kushchovi"). Their weaponry consisted of a small number of firearms, and mainly agricultural and household tools, e.g. axes, pitchforks, scythes, knives. In 1943, SKU departments existed throughout the whole Volhynia region.

In Zakerzonia 
SKU units on the Polish territory defended the Ukrainian population of Zakerzonia in the Peremyshl foothills (Polish: Pogórze Przemyskie), Beskids (Polish: Bieszczady), Kholm and Lublin voivodeships (Polish: Lubelszczyzny) from the gangs of robbers, subdivisions of Armia Krajowa, Polish nationalist groups, they tried to save Ukrainians from the deportation to the Ukrainian SSR from Poland in 1944–1946, prevent the eviction from their homeland as part of Operation Vistula in 1947, and protect them against repressions by the Polish pro-communist authorities.

Historical assessment of SKU activities 
The assessment of the Self-Defense Kushch Units' activities is quite contradictory.

Polish researcher of the Volyn tragedy Ewa Siemaszko believes that due to the small number of firearms SKU could not properly resist the Soviet partisans and the German occupiers, and therefore the OUN was using them to attack Polish colonies, although the history of most of the Self-Defense Kushch Units denies this statement.

Meanwhile, Grzegorz Motyka, a Polish historian and a board member of the Institute of National Remembrance (Poland) specializing in Ukrainian topic, believes that the main goal of SKU was to protect Ukrainian villages from attacks.

This is how Yuri Sudyn, born in 1933, recalls his older brother Dmytro Sudyn, born in 1928 in the village of Stary Lubliniec in the Zakerzonia region, a member of the local SKU "Trembita" (who collaborated with the UPA kurin "Mesnyky"):

See also 

 Pavlokoma village tragedy
 Pyskorovychi
 Sahryn Massacre

References 

1942 in Ukraine
Poland–Ukraine relations
Ukrainian guerrillas
Ukraine in World War II
Ukrainian Insurgent Army